Helen Binney Kitchel (September 9, 1890 - February 11, 1990) was an American politician. She is best known for her fight against billboards. She was elected in the Connecticut House of Representatives from 1931 to 1939. She was the first woman in Connecticut to have a bill named after her.

Kitchel was born on September 9, 1890, in Old Greenwich to parents Edwin Binney and Alice Stead Binney. She attended the Catherine Aiken School in Stamford. She married Allan Farrand Kitchel 1909.

Helen Binney Kitchel Natural Park was named after her, as is a holly grove at Greenwich Point beach. In 1961 Kitchel gave the state of Connecticut a tract of land that forms what is now called Algonquin State Forest.

References

External links 

 Helen Binney Kitchel Oral History

1890 births
1990 deaths

Members of the Connecticut House of Representatives
Women state legislators in Connecticut
Billboards
People from Old Greenwich, Connecticut